Svetlana Kuznetsova was the defending champion, but chose not to participate in 2003.

Elena Dementieva won the title. She defeated Chanda Rubin in the final with the loss of just three games.

Seeds

  Chanda Rubin (final)
  Elena Dementieva (champion)
  Conchita Martínez (second round)
  Jelena Dokić (first round)
  Tamarine Tanasugarn (quarterfinals)
  Cara Black (withdrew)
  Émilie Loit (first round)
  Cho Yoon-jeong (second round)
  Ashley Harkleroad (first round)

Draw

Finals

Top half

Bottom half

References

2003 WTA Tour
Commonwealth Bank Tennis Classic
Sport in Indonesia